Rick Shelley (January 1, 1947 – January 27, 2001) was a military science fiction author. Born in Kankakee, Illinois.

Bibliography

Varayan Memoir
Varay is a medieval land situated between our world and the all magical world of Fairy. The Varayan Memoir follows the adventures of Gil Tyner a college student turned medieval adventurer.
 Son of the Hero (1990)
 The Hero of Varay (1991)
 The Hero King (1992)

Seven Towers
 The Wizard at Mecq (1994)
 The Wizard at Home (1995)

Second Commonwealth War
 The Buchanan Campaign (1995)
 The Fires Of Coventry (1996)
 Return to Camerein (1997)

13 Spaceborn
 Until Relieved (1994)
 Side Show (1994)
 Jump Pay (1995)

Dirigent Mercenary Corps
This is the story of Lon Nolan, and his progression through the ranks of The Dirigent Mercenary  Corps. (DMC) He was originally a cadet at a military academy for the North American Army in Colorado Springs, but was cheated out of his chance to serve in his home land's armed forces when growing political dissent prompted the government to declare that a large portion of the military academy's graduating class would be commissioned into the police forces. He was given a second chance at a soldier's life, as a professional soldier on the colony world of Dirigent. Dirigent's sole industry is war, and the DMC is law. Lon soon becomes a proficient officer, a proud Dirigenter, and even the father of a corpsman.

 Officer Cadet (1998)
 Lieutenant (1998)
 Captain (1999)
 Major (1999)
 Lieutenant Colonel (2000)
 Colonel (2000)

Spec Ops Squad
 Holding The Line (2001)
 Deep Strike (2002)
 Sucker Punch (2002)

External links

20th-century American novelists
21st-century American novelists
American male novelists
American science fiction writers
Novelists from Illinois
People from Kankakee, Illinois
1947 births
2001 deaths
American male short story writers
20th-century American short story writers
21st-century American short story writers
20th-century American male writers
21st-century American male writers